Victoria Orvañanos (born October 31, 1981, Mexico City) is a Mexican screenwriter known for her work in Mexican television shows such as Dogma, En Tierras Salvajes, Las Amazonas, and Esperanza Del Corazón.

Early life and education
Orvañanos was born on October 31, 1981, in Mexico City, Mexico, to Julio Orvañanos Alatorre, a publicist, and a British-Mexican mother, Victoria Archer Cuillery. Her father introduced her to film and TV production at an early age.

She studied at Colegio Regina, a Catholic school of nuns in Mexico City, and St. Mary's School in England. She then went to study screenwriting and film scoring at the University of California, Los Angeles (UCLA). She then attended Columbia University.

Then, during her professional career as a screenwriter, she studied online Modern Masterpieces of World Literature at Harvard University.

Career
Orvañanos began her career with Televisa, a leading Mexican television broadcasting company, where she worked from 2008 to 2018. During this time, she wrote several telenovelas that aired globally and collaborated with various producers including Luis De Llano and Salvador Mejía, to write Las Amazonas, Nueva Vida, Esperanza Del Corazón, and En Tierras Salvajes in collaboration with the Spanish television production company Bambú Productions (Velvet, Cable Girls).

During this time, Orvañanos also worked at Alazraki Entertainment with Gaz Alazraki and Moisés Chiver, where she met Leonardo Zimbrón (producer of Netflix's Club de Cuervos). The two worked alongside Mónica Vargas for Traziende Films to write Dogma, Mexico's first supernatural mystery TV series, which aired in November 2017 in Latin America for Televisa.

Currently, as of 2022, Orvañanos collaborates for Amazon Studios and is also developing three projects of her authorship with producers Alex Balassa and Marisol Mijares at Balassa Films that include a romantic period drama, a World War II thriller, and an epic Biblical drama. Before the pandemic, Orvañanos was producing the Broadway play The Elephant Man by Bernard Pomerance to stage in Mexico City, but production had to be shut down due to the COVID-19 pandemic.

Orvañanos also runs a non-profit organization, Levantemos a México, which teaches art skills to children in street situations. The organization launched a photography exposition titled Black & White at the National Museum of Art in Mexico City (MUNAL).

Personal life
Orvañanos is a trained soprano and plays the violin, guitar, bass, and piano. She currently lives in Mexico City, Los Angeles, and New York City. She is related to Julio Orvañanos Zuñiga (grandfather), a renowned Mexican publicist, and Raul Orvañanos (uncle), a former football player and currently a football commentator for Fox Studios.

References

Living people
1981 births
Mexican women screenwriters
21st-century Mexican screenwriters